Carlos Alberto Pereyra (born May 5, 1911) was an Argentine boxer who competed in the 1932 Summer Olympics. He was born in Córdoba. In 1932 he was eliminated in the quarter-finals of the bantamweight class after losing his fight to Joseph Lang.

References
Carlos Pereyra's profile at Sports Reference.com

External links
 

1911 births
Year of death missing
Bantamweight boxers
Olympic boxers of Argentina
Boxers at the 1932 Summer Olympics
Argentine male boxers